The 1986–87 Argentine Primera División was the 96th season of top-flight football in Argentina. The season began on July 13, 1986 and ended on May 2, 1987.

League standings

Top scorers

Relegation
Deportivo Italiano were relegated with the worst points average (0.600)
Temperley were relegated after losing 2-0 to Platense in the relegation playoff.

Liguilla Pre-Libertadores
Deportivo Armenio, Banfield and Belgrano qualified as the top 3 teams in the 2nd division.

Quarter finals

Semi-finals

Final

Independiente qualified for Copa Libertadores 1987.

See also
1986–87 in Argentine football

References

Argentine Primera División seasons
1986–87 in Argentine football
Argentine
Argentine